Gifford Beal (January 24, 1879 – February 5, 1956) was an American painter, watercolorist, printmaker and muralist.

Early life
Born in New York City, Gifford Beal was the youngest son in a family of six surviving children. His oldest brother Reynolds Beal (1866–1951) also went on to become an accomplished painter as did his niece Marjorie Acker (1894–1985), who married Duncan Phillips, the founder of The Phillips Collection of Washington D.C.

Beal knew from an early age that he wanted to paint. Between 1892 and 1901 he studied with William Merritt Chase (1849–1916) on weekends in New York City and during the summer at Chase’s Shinnecock Hills Summer School of Art on Long Island.

After graduating from Princeton University in 1900 he studied at the Art Students League of New York from 1901 to 1903 with George Brandt Bridgman (1864–1943) and Frank Vincent DuMond (1865–1951).

Career rise and recognition
In 1903 Beal won his first award (3rd prize) in a competitive exhibition, held at Worcester Art Museum, Massachusetts. Many prizes followed including those awarded by:

National Academy of Design, New York, (Hallgarten Prize in 1910)
Corcoran Gallery of Art, Washington, DC, (3rd Medal and $1,000 Prize in 1914)
Panama Pacific Exposition, San Francisco, (gold medal in 1915)
Art Institute of Chicago, International Watercolor Exhibition, (Blair Prize in 1930)
Exposition Internationale des Arts et Techniques dans la Vie Moderne (1937), Paris, (silver medal in 1937)
National Academy of Design, New York, (Saltus Medal in 1948)
National Academy of Design, New York, (Samuel Finley Breese Morse gold medal in 1954)
National Academy of Design, New York, (Edward Palmer memorial Prize in 1955)
           
Beal was elected President of the Art Students League of New York in 1916, again in 1918, and from 1920 he held this office continuously until 1930, becoming the longest serving President in its history. He taught at The Art Students’ League in 1931 and 1932.

In 1920 Beal held his first one-man exhibition at Kraushaar Galleries in New York City. It was the beginning of a lifelong relationship he would have with the gallery. His work was exhibited continuously in the country.

Beal’s involvement with organizations for the advancement of the arts began in 1908 when he was elected to Associate by the National Academy of Design; in 1914 he was elected to National Academician. In 1923 he became a member of the National Institute of Arts and Letters, and in 1943 he became a member of the American Academy of Arts and Letters. He was a National Academician of the American Watercolor Society from 1910 until 1955. He was also a member of the Century Association, a New York City club founded in 1847 for artists and writers.

Beal also taught, and among his pupils was the painter Ann Brockman. His work was part of the painting event in the art competition at the 1936 Summer Olympics.

Museums and government buildings

Beal’s work is held in an array of museum collections:
Metropolitan Museum, New York City
Whitney Museum of American Art, New York City
Cleveland Museum of Art, Ohio
The Phillips Collection, Washington D.C.
Los Angeles County Museum of Art, California
Detroit Institute of Arts, Michigan
Art Institute of Chicago, Illinois
Nelson-Atkins Museum of Art, Kansas City, Missouri
Florence Griswold Museum, Old Lyme, Connecticut
New Britain Museum of American Art, New Britain, Connecticut 
Virginia Museum of Fine Arts, Richmond, Virginia
Hudson River Museum, Yonkers, New York
Telfair Museums, Georgia
Frye Art Museums, Washington
Amon Carter Museum of American Art, Texas
Crystal Bridges Museum of American Art, Arkansas
Virginia Museum of Fine Arts, Virginia
McNay Art Museum, Texas
Indianapolis Museum of Art, Indiana
Canton Museum of Art, Ohio
Terra Foundation for American Art, Illinois
Smithsonian American Art Museum, Washington D.C.
British Museum, London, England
Everson Museum of Art, New York
Princeton University Art Museum, New Jersey
Brooklyn Museum, New York
University of Michigan Museum of Art, Michigan
Mildred Lane Kemper Art Museum, Missouri
New-York Historical Society, New York
New Britain Museum of American Art, Connecticut
Maier Museum of Art, Lynchburg, Virginia
Beal was commissioned to produce murals for several government buildings:
Allentown, Pennsylvania, Post Office,  1938
Main Interior Building, Washington D.C., 1941
 Crestline, Ohio Post Office, 1943

Gifford Beal Archive
The Smithsonian Institution in Washington D.C. holds an archive concerning Beal’s career as an artist containing correspondence, writings, works of art and printed material, much of it provided by Kraushaar Galleries, New York City. This collection has been fully digitized and is available online.

Style and inspiration
Beal’s subjects varied.  He found inspiration not only in holiday spectacle and pageantry but also in the natural and everyday side of life.  Some of his best known pictures are of holiday crowds, circus performers and hunting scenes.  Yet, Beal enjoyed painting the Caribbean Islands and the landscape along the Hudson River and in Gloucester and Rockport, Massachusetts, where he spent many summers.  He depicted many scenes of the fishermen who worked there.

The French Impressionists' use of color and light to create form and atmosphere provided Beal's first influence.  As his personal style developed, other elements of painting were emphasized:  compositions were built on line and form thereby adding more solidity to the work.  For example, he depended on balanced, rhythmic elements to depict motion in riding or fishing scenes.  Beal believed in the power of spontaneity and would sometimes rework a "dead" area of color with line in order to revitalize it.

Beal's style underwent a simplification in the 1930s, his "austere" phase which coincided with American regionalism.  As he grew older, his work became increasingly free and spirited, in part due to his exploration of different media, especially egg/oil tempera and brush and ink.  These changes increased his sense of color and gesture, and he began to emphasize the abstract qualities of his subject.  He did some of his boldest and brightest work during the last years of his life.

Notes

References
"Gifford Beal-An Appreciation," by Barry Faulkner for the Memorial Exhibition of Paintings by Gifford Beal (New York: American Academy of Arts and Letters, 1956).
"His Art Was Joyful: Death of Gifford Beal, 14 Years President of the League", Art Students League News 9, No. 3 (March 1956).
"Chase the Artist," by Gifford Beal, Scribner's Magazine 61 (February 1917):258.
"Gifford Beal: Perennially Youthful Painter of the Good Life," American Artist (October 1953):24.
"Gifford Beal’s Versatility," Helen Comstock, International Studio (June 1923): 242.
"A Collection in the Making”, Duncan Phillips 1926, E. Weyhe, New York

External links
 A Finding aid to the Gifford Beal sketches, sketchbooks and papers, 1889-2001, bulk 1900-1954 in the Archives of American Art, Smithsonian Institution
 Century Association
 Department of Interior Museum
 American Watercolor Society
 Florence Griswold Museum
 Gifford Beal exhibition catalogs (full pdf) from The Metropolitan Museum of Art Libraries

1879 births
1956 deaths
19th-century American painters
American male painters
20th-century American painters
American muralists
Art Students League of New York alumni
Art Students League of New York faculty
Princeton University alumni
Painters from New York City
Section of Painting and Sculpture artists
Olympic competitors in art competitions
19th-century American male artists
20th-century American male artists
Members of the American Academy of Arts and Letters